Dan Furphy is an American politician serving as a member of the Wyoming Senate from the 10th district since January 4, 2021. A member of the Republican, Furphy previously served as a member of the Wyoming House of Representatives from the 14th district from 2017 to 2021.

Career
Prior to his election to the state legislature, Furphy served as president of the Laramie Chamber Business Alliance. Furphy served on the Laramie City Council from 1999 to 2000.

Elections

2016
When incumbent Republican Speaker of the Wyoming House of Representatives Kermit Brown announced his retirement, Furphy declared his candidacy for the seat. Furphy ran unopposed in the Republican primary and defeated Democrat Erin O'Doherty in the general election with 60% of the vote.

References

External links
Official page at the Wyoming Legislature
Profile from Ballotpedia

Living people
Republican Party members of the Wyoming House of Representatives
Wyoming city council members
Politicians from Laramie, Wyoming
21st-century American politicians
Year of birth missing (living people)